Phrantela kutikina is a species of minute freshwater snail with an operculum, an aquatic gastropod mollusc or micromollusc in the family Hydrobiidae. This species is endemic to Australia.

References

Gastropods of Australia
Phrantela
Vulnerable fauna of Australia
Taxonomy articles created by Polbot